John Barrett Dunlop is an American political scientist, an emeritus senior fellow at the Hoover Institution, an expert on Soviet and Russian politics from 1980s to the present.

Bachelor's degree, magna cum laude, from Harvard University and master's and doctoral degrees from Yale University. National Fellow at the Hoover Institution in 1978–79.

Books

2018: (With Vladimir Kara-Murza) The February 2015 Assassination of Boris Nemtsov and the Flawed Trial of His Alleged Killers
2017:  Exodus: St. John Maximovitch Leads His Flock Out of Shanghai
2012: The Moscow Bombings of September 1999: Examinations of Russian Terrorist Attacks at the Onset of Vladimir Putin's Rule 
2006: The 2002 Dubrovka and 2004 Beslan Hostage Crises: a Critique of Russian Counter-Terrorism 
1998: Russia Confronts Chechnya: Roots of a Separatist Conflict 
1993: The Rise of Russia and the Fall of the Soviet Union
1985: The New Russian Nationalism
1983: The Faces of Contemporary Russian Nationalism
1976: New Russian Revolutionaries
1972: Staretz Amvrosy, Model for Dostoevsky's Staretz Zossima

References

External links
Inventory of the John B. Dunlop collection at the Online Archive of California
Printed matter related to the disintegration of the Soviet Union, and to political conditions in post-Soviet Russia. Includes a 1968 official Soviet report (incomplete), summarizing results of the investigation of the All-Russian Social-Christian Union for the Liberation of the People. 

Living people
American political scientists
Hoover Institution people
Yale University alumni
Harvard University alumni
1942 births